Jiuzantou railway station is a railway station located in Hengshan, Hsinchu County, Taiwan. It is located on the Neiwan line and is operated by the Taiwan Railways Administration.

References

Railway stations opened in 1950
Railway stations in Hsinchu County
Railway stations served by Taiwan Railways Administration